Voz da Verdade Discography comprises several studio, live, video and special albums by the Brazilian band Voz da Verdade. The band has more than 5,000,000 records sold, in addition to certificates of gold, platinum, double platinum, triple platinum and diamond.

Albums

Studio albums

Live albums

Videography

Especials

References 

Brazilian Christian music
Christian music discographies